Rhododendron lutescens is a rhododendron species native to Guizhou, Sichuan, and Yunnan, China, where it grows at altitudes of 1700–2000 meters. It is a shrub that grows to 1–3 m in height, with leaves that are lanceolate, oblong-lanceolate or ovate-lanceolate, 4–9 by 1.5–2.5 cm in size. Flowers are yellow.

References

External links 

 Hirsutum.com

lutescens
Endemic flora of China
Flora of Yunnan
Flora of Sichuan
Flora of Guizhou